Abibilla Kudayberdiev (Kyrgyz and Russian: Абибилла Кудайбердиев born June 1, 1962) is the former Minister of Defense of Kyrgyzstan.

Biography 

He was born on June 1, 1962 in the Nookat District, in the city of Osh. In 1983, he graduated from the Alma-Ata Higher All-Arms Command School in the Kazakh SSR. In 2003, he graduated from the Combined Arms Academy of the Russian Federation. From 2008 to 2009, he served as the head of the Bishkek Higher Military School. In November 2009, he was appointed the Chief of the General Staff of Armed Forces, serving in this capacity for 7 months. In July 2010 he served Minister of Defense of the Kyrgyz Republic. On April 4, 2014, by the Decree of the President of the Kyrgyzstan, Kudayberdiev was re-appointed Minister of Defense of Kyrgyzstan. He was relieved of his post as Minister of Defense on October 12, 2015 by President Atambayev.

Education 
 1983 - Alma-Ata Higher All-Arms Command School
 2003 - Combined Arms Academy of the Armed Forces of the Russian Federation

Awards 
 Order of Manas
 Medal of Erdik

See also 
Ministry of Defense of the Kyrgyz Republic

References 

1962 births
Living people
Government ministers of Kyrgyzstan
People from Osh Region
Ministers of Defence of Kyrgyzstan
Kyrgyzstani generals